{{Infobox television
| genre              = Variety show, Reality show, Travel documentary
| director           = Kim Joon-hyun, Seo Jeong-woo<ref name="productionteam">{{Cite web|title=Wizard of Nowheres production team on MBC official website|url=http://www.imbc.com/broad/tv/ent/ozwizard/concept/index.html|work=MBC|accessdate=December 5, 2017|language=ko}}</ref>
| starring           = Various artists
| country            = South Korea
| language           = Korean
| num_episodes       = 31
| list_episodes      = #List of Episodes
| executive_producer = Park Jeong-gyu
| producer           = Ahn Soo-young
| location           = Multi-countries
| runtime            = 70 minutes
| network            = MBC
| picture_format     = 1080i
| audio_format       = 2 channels Dolby Digital
| first_aired        = 
| last_aired         = 
}}Wizard of Nowhere''''' is a South Korean travel-reality show on MBC TV that started airing on June 5, 2017. The cast of six, divided into two teams, goes to another country for three days. In those three days, they are given missions to do. Before midnight strikes, they must reach their destination for the day. The cast has no phones or wallets or money with them, or even personal belongings. All they have are the essentials from the producers: sleeping bags, tents, cooking equipment, utensils, and some hiking gear. Most of the time, they rely on hitchhiking to complete strangers to get around.

Broadcast timeline

Cast

Regular members

Guest members

List of episodes

Pilot

Regular broadcast

Ratings 

2017

2018

Awards and nominations

References 

2017 South Korean television series debuts
2018 South Korean television series endings
Korean-language television shows
MBC TV original programming
South Korean reality television series
South Korean variety television shows